Spital am Semmering, in the Semmering Pass, is a municipality in the district of Bruck-Mürzzuschlag in Styria, Austria. It is home to the Stuhleck ski hill. Spital was largely endowed in 1160 by seven of the Margrave of Styria's ministeriales.  The endowment included income from wide estates, vineyards and a town.

References

Fischbach Alps
Cities and towns in Bruck-Mürzzuschlag District